Liublynets is an urban-type settlement in Kovel Raion of Volyn Oblast in Ukraine. Population:

Economy

Transportation
Liublynets-Volynskyi railway station is on the railway connecting Lviv via Volodymyr with Kovel. There is infrequent passenger traffic.

The settlement is connected by road with Kovel and Volodymyr. In Kovel, it has access to Highway M07 connecting Kyiv via Korosten with Kovel, as well as to Highway M19 connecting Chernivtsi via Ternopil and Lutsk with Kovel.

References

Urban-type settlements in Kovel Raion